V1017 Sagittarii is a cataclysmic variable star system in the constellation Sagittarius. It first erupted in 1919, reaching magnitude 7. Its other eruptions in 1901, 1973 and 1991 only reached magnitude 10, leading it to be reclassified from a recurrent nova to a dwarf nova.

After the eruption of 1919, the orbital period of the binary system has decreased by 0.0273%, to the 5.786290 days. Physical models cannot explain the orbital change of such sign and magnitude as in 2019.

References

Dwarf novae
Sagittarius (constellation)
Sagittarii, V1017
J18320447-2923125
G-type giants
White dwarfs
Eclipsing binaries